Robert Phillip Charrow (born October 21, 1944) is an American lawyer and government official.

Currently a shareholder at the law firm of Greenberg Traurig, he was nominated by President Donald Trump to be the General Counsel of the United States Department of Health and Human Services. He was confirmed on December 21, 2017. He previously worked for the law firm of Crowell & Moring. In the Ronald Reagan administration, Charrow served as Deputy and then Principal Deputy General Counsel for the U.S. Department of Health and Human Services. In those roles, he supervised the chief counsel for the Health Care Financing Administration, Office of Inspector General, the Food and Drug Administration, and the United States Public Health Service.

References

External links
 Biography at U.S. Department of Health & Human Services
 Biography at Greenberg Traurig

Living people
American jurists
Stanford Law School alumni
Harvey Mudd College alumni
American male non-fiction writers
American legal writers
Reagan administration personnel
Trump administration personnel
1944 births